Davis v. United States, 495 U.S. 472 (1990), was a case decided by the United States Supreme Court. It concerned claims made by parents of two missionaries of the Church of Jesus Christ of Latter-day Saints, that their monetary contributions toward their sons' mission expenses constituted a "charitable contribution" under provisions of Treas. Reg. § 1.170A-1(g) (1989), a position that lower courts had rejected. In a unanimous decision, the Court ruled that these contributions could not be seen as "charitable contributions" under provisions of that statute.

Background 
A husband and wife, members of the Church of Jesus Christ of Latter-day Saints, transferred funds into the personal checking accounts of their two sons, who were called to service as full-time, unpaid missionaries for the Church. The amount transferred equaled the amount the Church estimated would be needed to support this service. The sons used the transferred funds primarily to pay for rent, food, transportation, and personal needs while on their missions (in conformity with Church guidelines, which required such funds to be spent for only missionary work and forbade various leisure or personal activities). The sons submitted weekly reports of their total expenses for the week and month to date (even though these guidelines did not require the sons to obtain advance approval of each expenditure they made from their checking accounts).

In their 1984 amended federal income tax returns for the years 1980 and 1981, the parents claimed these amounts as deductible charitable contributions. The Internal Revenue Service disallowed the claims. The parents sued for refund of the claimed amounts pursuant to § 170 of the Internal Revenue Code (which allows a deduction for a charitable contribution or gift "to or for the use of" a qualified organization) or as unreimbursed expenditures made incident to the rendition of services to a charitable organization under Treas. Reg. § 1.170A-1(g) (1989). In a second set of amended tax returns, filed in 1986, the parents limited their claimed charitable deductions to the amounts that had been indicated by the Church.

The District Court, granting summary judgment to the United States, found that the payments were not made "for the use of" the Church within the meaning of 26 U.S.C. § 170. Additionally, the court found the payments did not qualify as "reasonable expenditures" incurred while providing services to the Church, so as to be deductible under Treas Reg. 1.170A-1(g) (26 CFR 1.170A-1(g)), which provides that unreimbursed expenditures made incident to the rendition of services to an organization, contributions to which are deductible, may constitute a deductible contribution under 26 U.S.C. § 170.

The United States Court of Appeals for the Ninth Circuit affirmed the decision of the district court, holding that the funds in question were not deductible under 26 U.S.C. § 170, as the Church lacked actual control over the disposition of the funds, and 26 CFR 1.170A-1(g) did not apply to the parents, as the regulation permits a deduction for unreimbursed expenses by only the taxpayer who performed the charitable service.

Opinion of the Court 
Justice Sandra Day O'Connor wrote an opinion for a unanimous court, affirming the judgment of the lower courts and holding that, for purposes of 26 U.S.C. § 170, these payments were not charitable contributions "for the use of" petitioners' church. The Court instead accepted the government's interpretation of the statute: that a contribution or gift is "for the use of" a qualified organization only when it is held in a legally enforceable trust for the organization or in a similar legal arrangement. Justice O'Connor stated that the legislative history, the generally understood meaning of the language used, and the contemporaneous and longstanding construction all supported this interpretation. By contrast, Petitioners deposited the funds directly into their sons' personal bank accounts. Although the sons promised to spend the money only on church-related expenses, they had no legal obligation to do so. Petitioners did not donate the funds in trust for the church.

Justice O'Connor also concluded that the parents were not entitled to a deduction under 26 CFR 1.170A-1(g), as that regulation allows taxpayers to claim deductions for only the expenditures made in connection with their own contributions of services to charities. Petitioners were unable to claim a deduction for the funds as unreimbursed expenditures incident to a contribution of charitable services under Treas. Reg. § 1.10A-1(g) (1989) since the expenditures were not incurred in connection with petitioners' own rendition of services and they did not render the services.

See also 
 Charitable trust
 List of United States Supreme Court cases, volume 495

References

External links

 

1990 in United States case law
1990 in religion
Mormonism and law
United States Supreme Court cases
United States taxation and revenue case law
20th-century Mormonism
United States Supreme Court cases of the Rehnquist Court
Mormon missionaries
Christianity and law in the 20th century